The Ed Chynoweth Trophy is awarded to the leading scorer at the Memorial Cup tournament.  It was first awarded in 1996. In the case of a tie in points, the award is given to the player with the fewest games played. If they have played the same number of games, the award goes to the player with the most goals scored. 

No player has won the award twice.  Amongst the three leagues, a player from the Quebec Major Junior Hockey League (QMJHL) has won the award eight times, while players representing the Ontario Hockey League (OHL) has won it five times and Western Hockey League (WHL) has won the award four times. The WHL's Vancouver Giants, the QMJHL's Hull/Gatineau Olympiqes and the Halifax Mooseheads have twice had one of their players win the award. Mitch Marner has the highest winning total for the award with 14 points, though he falls short of the tournament record of 16 points set by Jeff Larmer of the Kitchener Rangers in 1982 and Guy Rouleau of the Olympiques in 1986.

The trophy is named after Ed Chynoweth, who was the president of the WHL from 1972 to 1996.  He helped create the Canadian Hockey League (CHL) and served as its president from 1975 until 1996. Chynoweth was instrumental in the creation of the CHL, and as its president, he helped create Canadian junior hockey's scholarship program and organized the Memorial Cup into a tournament format. Chynoweth stepped down as WHL and CHL president in 1996 when he was awarded a WHL expansion franchise, the Edmonton Ice (now Kootenay Ice), a team he operated until his death in 2008. He was inducted into the Hockey Hall of Fame shortly after his death.

Winners

See also
List of Canadian Hockey League awards

References

External links
 History – Awards – Mastercard Memorial Cup

Canadian Hockey League trophies and awards